Hot Pants is the 32nd studio album by American musician James Brown. The album was released in August 1971, by Polydor Records.

Track listing 
All tracks composed by James Brown; except "Blues & Pants" by James Brown and Fred Westley (Fred Wesley)

Personnel 
 James Brown - vocals
 Bobby Byrd - vocals, organ on "Blues & Pants" and tambourine on "Hot Pants (She Got To Use What She Got To Get What She Wants)"
 Hearlon Cheese Martin, Robert Lee Coleman - guitar
 Fred Thomas - bass
 St. Clair Pinckney - tenor saxophone
 Jimmy Parker - alto saxophone
 Fred Wesley - trombone
 Jerone Jasaan Sanford, Russell Crimes - trumpet (tracks: 1, 2, 5)
 Johnny Griggs - congas (tracks: 3, 4, 6)  
 John "Jabo" Starks - drums

References

1971 albums
James Brown albums
Albums produced by James Brown
Polydor Records albums